Ernane Galvêas (1 October 1922 – 23 June 2022) was a Brazilian economist and politician. He served as president of the Central Bank of Brazil from 1968 to 1974 and again from 1979 to 1980. He was also Minister of the Economy from 1980 to 1985.

Galvêas died on 23 June 2022 at the age of 99.

References

1922 births
2022 deaths
Brazilian economists
20th-century Brazilian politicians
Finance Ministers of Brazil
Presidents of the Central Bank of Brazil
People from Espírito Santo
Princeton University alumni